Government House, St. John's, Antigua and Barbuda, is the official residence and office of the governor-general of Antigua and Barbuda. It was built in the 17th-century colonial style with Georgian architecture and extensive gardens. The residence is not open to the public.

History
An early Government House was burnt to the ground in 1710, when the unpopular governor of the Leeward Islands, Colonel Daniel Parke, was killed. Later governors resided in rented homes, although Thomas Pitt (governor 1728–1729) proposed a new permanent residence.

The current Government House was built in the early 1800s. The stately home fell into disrepair, but a private society (along the government) raised funds to have the building restored.

See also
 Government Houses of the British Empire
 Governors General of Antigua & Barbuda

References

Buildings and structures in St. John's, Antigua and Barbuda
Official residences
.
Government of Antigua and Barbuda
Politics of Antigua and Barbuda